Phaeobotryosphaeria is a genus of fungi in the family Botryosphaeriaceae. There are 10 species.

Species
Phaeobotryosphaeria chrysites
Phaeobotryosphaeria citrigena
Phaeobotryosphaeria hypoxyloides
Phaeobotryosphaeria leonensis
Phaeobotryosphaeria plicatula
Phaeobotryosphaeria porosa
Phaeobotryosphaeria thomesiana
Phaeobotryosphaeria varians
Phaeobotryosphaeria visci
Phaeobotryosphaeria yerbae

External links
 Index Fungorum

Botryosphaeriaceae